Ancistranthus is a genus of flowering plants belonging to the family Acanthaceae.

Its native range is Cuba.

Species:
 Ancistranthus harpochiloides (Griseb.) Lindau

References

Acanthaceae
Acanthaceae genera